"A Long December" is a song by American alternative rock band Counting Crows. The ballad is the second single and 13th track from their second album, Recovering the Satellites (1996). Lead singer Adam Duritz was inspired to write the track after his friend was hit by a car, making the song about reflecting on tragedy with a positive disposition.

Released in December 1996, "A Long December" peaked at number five on the US Billboard Modern Rock Tracks chart and number one on the Canadian RPM Top Singles chart. In December 1997, the song was re-released in the United Kingdom and reached number 68, six places below its original peak of number 62. American Songwriter magazine named "A Long December" the best Counting Crows song in April 2022.

Background and composition
In an interview with Rolling Stone magazine, lead singer Adam Duritz explained that he was inspired to write "A Long December" after one of his friends had been hit by a car. While the song is a reflection on tragedy, it also possesses an optimistic tone. According to Duritz, the song is about "looking back on your life and seeing changes happening" while simultaneously looking forward to change in the future. Although "A Long December" never has the narrator obtaining a firm resolution from his retrospect, a sense of hopefulness exists by the song's conclusion. Musically, "A Long December" is an alternative rock ballad. The track is composed in the key of F major and written in common time, possessing a tempo of 72 beats per minute.

Chart performance
In the United States, "A Long December" was ineligible to chart on the Billboard Hot 100 since it was never released as a physical single there, which was a rule at that time. The song instead appeared on the Hot 100 Airplay chart, where it peaked at number six in February 1997 and spent 29 weeks on the chart. On other Billboard rankings, the song entered the top 10 on five of them, reaching number one on the Adult Alternative Songs chart for two weeks. In Canada, the song became a number-one hit for two weeks and was the seventh-most-successful song of 1997. On the UK Singles Chart, "A Long December" charted twice, peaking at number 62 during its original run in December 1996 and re-entering the listing at number 68 one year later. The single also charted in the Netherlands, reaching number 68, and in Australia, peaking at number 86.

Music video
Lawrence Carroll directed the music video for "A Long December", which features American actress Courteney Cox, whom Duritz was dating at the time. Filmed in Hollywood, California, the video was produced by Victoria Vallas. The clip was first added to MTV, VH1, and The Box on the week ending December 1, 1996. The video, which evokes a somber mood with its images of snow and dull colors, features Duritz playing a piano in the woods and Cox writing a letter in a dark room. Throughout the clip are scenes of a chalkboard with dates written on it and Counting Crows playing their instruments. Cox eventually leaves the building she is in and walks to a bus stop, clutching her note. Niko Stratis of Spin magazine called the video "perfect".

Track listings
All songs were written by Duritz except where noted. All live tracks were recorded at Elysée Montmartre (Paris, France) on December 9, 1994.

UK CD1 and Australian CD single
 "A Long December" (LP version)
 "Ghost Train" (live)
 "Sullivan Street" (live) 

UK CD2
 "A Long December" – 4:55
 "A Murder of One" (live)  – 14:57

European CD single
 "A Long December" (LP version)
 "Ghost Train" (live)

Credits and personnel
Credits are lifted from the Recovering the Satellites booklet.

Studios
 Recorded in late 1996 at The Sound Factory (Hollywood, California)
 Mixed at River Sound (New York City)
 Mastered at Gateway Mastering (Portland, Maine, US)

Counting Crows
 Adam F. Duritz – words, music, vocals, piano, Wurlitzer, tambourine
 David Bryson – guitars, Dobro, tambourine, vocals
 Dan Vickrey – guitars, vocals
 Matt Malley – electric bass guitar, double bass, vocals
 Charles Gillingham – Hammond B-3, piano, Mellotron, Wurlitzer, accordion, vocals
 Ben Mize – drums, tambourine, vocals

Other personnel
 Gil Norton – production
 Bradley Cook – recording
 Michael Barbiero – mixing
 Mark Phythian – programming
 Sevon Smokes Wright – assistant engineering
 Bob Ludwig – mastering

Charts

Weekly charts

Year-end charts

Release history

References

Counting Crows songs
1990s ballads
1996 singles
1996 songs
DGC Records singles
Geffen Records singles
Rock ballads
RPM Top Singles number-one singles
Song recordings produced by Gil Norton
Songs written by Adam Duritz